The Supermarine Sea Eagle was a British, passenger–carrying, amphibious flying boat. It was designed and built by the Supermarine Aviation Works for its subsidiary, the British Marine Air Navigation Co Ltd, to be used on their cross-channel route between Southampton, the Channel Islands and France.

Service
Three civilian aircraft were constructed, G-EBFK, G-EBGR and G-EBGS and the regular service between Southampton and Guernsey began on 25 September 1923 (the planned service to France was never implemented). This was Britain's first scheduled passenger air service by flying boat. However, G-EBFK crashed on 21 May 1924; in January 1927, G-EBGS was lost when it was rammed by a ship in the harbor of St Peter Port, Guernsey. The third aircraft continued on the route until 1928 when it was replaced by a Short S.8 Calcutta.

The wooden hull of the surviving Sea Eagle, G-EBGR, was retained by Vickers until 1949, when they presented it to the British Overseas Airways Corporation; BOAC burnt it in 1954 because of a lack of storage space.

Variants
The Supermarine Sheldrake used the hull of the Sea Eagle and the wings of the Seagull with a tractor engine installation. A single example was built.

The Supermarine Scarab was a military flying-boat, based on the Sea Eagle and Sheldrake but with a pusher engine, specially designed for the Spanish Navy. Twelve were eventually built and delivery to the Spanish Naval Air Service for use in the bomber/reconnaissance role during the Rif War. It was fitted with a .303 in (7.7 mm) Lewis gun and a bomb load of 1,000 lb 454 kg.

Operators

Spanish Navy
Spanish seaplane carrier Dédalo

 British Marine Air Navigation Co Ltd
 Imperial Airways

Specifications

See also
 List of flying boats and floatplanes

References

Bibliography
Andrews C.F. and Morgan, E.B. Supermarine Aircraft since 1914. London:Putnam, 1987. .
Jackson, A.J. British Civil Aircraft 1919–1972:Volume III. London:Putnam, 1988. .
London, Peter. British Flying Boats. Sutton Publishers Ltd. 2003. 
"The Supermarine 'Sea Eagle'", Flight, vol. XV, issue 26, pp. 351–352, 28 June 1923.

External links

 Imperial Airways
 The Scarab
 Service

1920s British airliners
Flying boats
Single-engined pusher aircraft
Sea Eagle
Biplanes
Aircraft first flown in 1923